The Trophée des Championnes is a French women's association football trophy contested as an annual match between the champions of Division 1 Féminine and the winners of the Coupe de France Féminine from previous season. It is the female equivalent to Trophée des Champions which is played since 1995. If both league and cup are won by the same team, the league runners-up will be qualified to play this match as the second team.

List of matches

Performance by clubs

References

External links
  

French football trophies and awards
Women's football competitions in France